Sergio Tamayo (born 28 March 1991) is a Spanish professional footballer who plays for Spanish Tercera División club Náxara CD, as a forward.

References

1991 births
Living people
Sportspeople from Logroño
Spanish footballers
Association football forwards
UD Logroñés players
MTK Budapest FC players
Segunda División B players
Nemzeti Bajnokság I players
Spanish expatriate footballers
Expatriate footballers in Hungary
Spanish expatriate sportspeople in Hungary